Twyford is a district on the Heretaunga Plains in New Zealand, north-west of Hastings City. The area is an agricultural area with orchards, vineyards and cropping as the main source of income.

Twyford had a population of 1,062 at the 2013 New Zealand census, a decrease of 3 people since the 2006 census. There were 522 males and 540 females. 89.7% were European, 10.9% were Māori, 2.7% were Pacific peoples and 1.8% were Asian.

Demographics

Twyford had a population of 807 at the 2018 New Zealand census, an increase of 42 people (5.5%) since the 2013 census, and an increase of 33 people (4.3%) since the 2006 census. There were 267 households, comprising 441 males and 366 females, giving a sex ratio of 1.2 males per female. The median age was 44.0 years (compared with 37.4 years nationally), with 141 people (17.5%) aged under 15 years, 150 (18.6%) aged 15 to 29, 378 (46.8%) aged 30 to 64, and 138 (17.1%) aged 65 or older.

Ethnicities were 84.8% European/Pākehā, 19.0% Māori, 4.8% Pacific peoples, 1.5% Asian, and 1.9% other ethnicities. People may identify with more than one ethnicity.

The percentage of people born overseas was 13.0, compared with 27.1% nationally.

Although some people chose not to answer the census's question about religious affiliation, 50.2% had no religion, 38.7% were Christian, 2.6% had Māori religious beliefs, 0.7% were Muslim, 0.4% were Buddhist and 0.7% had other religions.

Of those at least 15 years old, 105 (15.8%) people had a bachelor's or higher degree, and 141 (21.2%) people had no formal qualifications. The median income was $37,000, compared with $31,800 nationally. 138 people (20.7%) earned over $70,000 compared to 17.2% nationally. The employment status of those at least 15 was that 411 (61.7%) people were employed full-time, 96 (14.4%) were part-time, and 9 (1.4%) were unemployed.

Education
Twyford School is a co-educational state primary school with classes for new entrants through to Form 2.

The school was established in the early 20th century by New Zealand Major General Sir Andrew Hamilton Russell KCB, KCMG, who originated from Hawke's Bay and became a farm manager at Twyford. He formed the Hawke's Bay Mounted Rifle Volunteers before a notable First World War career. After the War he became an MP, an honorary colonel, president of the NZRA, an inspector of military forces,  and a founding member of the New Zealand Round Table. Russell had been an old boy of Twyford School, England, which was visited by the Principal of Twyford School New Zealand in 2010.

References

External links
Twyford School web site. Retrieved 21 June 2012

Hastings District
Populated places in the Hawke's Bay Region